Castle Rock 'n' Rollers is a women's flat track roller derby league based in Castle Rock, Colorado. Founded in 2008, as of 2017 the league consists of a single team which competes against teams from other leagues. Castle Rock is a member of the Women's Flat Track Derby Association (WFTDA).

The league played its first home bout in June 2009, against the Naughty Pines Derby Dames. and took their first win against the same opposition, in September.

The league was accepted into the Women's Flat Track Derby Association Apprentice Program in April 2010, and became a full member of the WFTDA in June 2011.

WFTDA rankings

 NR = no end-of-year ranking assigned

References

Castle Rock, Colorado
Roller derby leagues established in 2008
Roller derby leagues in Colorado
Women's Flat Track Derby Association Division 3
2008 establishments in Colorado